See Eastern Slavic naming customs for the explanation of the structure of Russian-language surnames.

A (А)

 Abakumov 
 Abdulov 
 Abramov 
 Abramovich 
 Avdeyev 
 Avdonin 
 Averin 
 Averyanov 
 Avilov 
 Agapov 
 Agafonov 
 Ageykin 
 Agliullin 
 Adaksin 
 Azarov 
 Akinfeev 
 Aksakov 
 Aksenchuk 
 Akhmedov 
 Aksyonov 
 Akulov 
 Aleyev 
 Alexandrov 
 Alexeyev 
 Alenin 
 Alekhin 
 Alyokhin 
 Aliyev 
 Alistratov 
 Alliluyev 
 Alogrin 
 Amaliyev 
 Amelin 
 Aminev 
 Ananyev 
 Anasenko 
 Andreyev 
 Andreyushkin 
 Andronikov 
 Andropov 
 Andryukhin 
 Anikanov 
 Anikin 
 Anisimov 
 Anishin 
 Ankudinov 
 Annenkov 
 Annikov 
 Anosov 
 Anokhin 
 Anoshkin 
 Anrep 
 Antakov 
 Antipin 
 Antipov 
 Antonov 
 Antonovich 
 Anushchenkov 
 Apalkov 
 Aptekar 
 Arefyev 
 Arzamastsev 
 Aristarkhov 
 Aristov 
 Arsenyev 
 Artamonov 
 Artemyev 
 Artyomov 
 Arkhangelsky 
 Arshavin 
 Aslanov 
 Aslakhanov 
 Aspidov 
 Assonov 
 Astankov 
 Astafyev 
 Astakhov 
 Afanaskin 
 Afanasyev 
 Afonin 
 Akhremenko 
 Ayushiyev 
 Ayushcheglov

B (Б)

 Babanin 
 Babaev 
 Babikov 
 Babichev 
 Babkin 
 Baburin 
 Babykin 
 Bagrov 
 Bazhanov 
 Bazhenov 
 Bazanov 
 Bazarov 
 Bazin 
 Balabanov 
 Balakin 
 Balakirev 
 Balandin 
 Balashov 
 Baranov 
 Baranovsky 
 Baratynsky 
 Barbolin 
 Barinov 
 Barkov 
 Barsukov 
 Baryshev 
 Baryshnikov 
 Baskin 
 Baskov 
 Batishchev 
 Batrutdinov 
 Bebnev 
 Bebchuk 
 Bezborodov 
 Bezobrazov 
 Bezrodny 
 Bezrukov 
 Bezukladnikov 
 Belevich 
 Belikov 
 Belinsky 
 Belov 
 Beloglazov 
 Belorusov 
 Belomestnov 
 Belomestnykh 
 Belousov 
 Belochkin 
 Belyakov 
 Belyaev 
 Benediktov 
 Berezhnoy 
 Berezin 
 Beriya 
 Bershov 
 Bespalov 
 Bessonov 
 Besfamilny 
 Bekhterev 
 Bilan 
 Biryukov 
 Blagonravov 
 Blazhenov 
 Blanter 
 Blatov 
 Blinov 
 Bliznyuk 
 Blok 
 Blokov 
 Blokhin 
 Blum 
 Bobkov 
 Bobr 
 Bobrik 
 Bobrinsky 
 Bobrov 
 Bogatyryov 
 Bogachyov 
 Bogdanov 
 Bogolepov 
 Bogolyubov 
 Bogolyubsky 
 Bogomazov 
 Bogomolov 
 Bogrov 
 Bogun 
 Bodrov 
 Boykov 
 Boytsov 
 Bok 
 Bokaryov 
 Boldyrev 
 Bolotnikov 
 Boltonogov 
 Bolshakov 
 Bolshov 
 Bondarev 
 Bondarchuk 
 Boreyev 
 Borzilov 
 Borisyuk 
 Borovkov 
 Borodin 
 Bortnik 
 Bortsov 
 Bocharov 
 Boyarov 
 Bravikov 
 Bragin 
 Brantov 
 Brezhnev 
 Brusilov 
 Bryzgalov 
 Bugayev 
 Bugaychuk 
 Bugakov 
 Budayev 
 Budanov 
 Budnikov 
 Budylin 
 Buzinsky 
 Buzov 
 Bukin 
 Bukov 
 Bulgakov 
 Bulygin 
 Bunin 
 Burdukovsky 
 Burkov 
 Burmakin 
 Burov 
 Burtsov 
 Bury 
 Buryakov 
 Butusov 
 Butylin 
 Bukhalo 
 Bykov 
 Bylinkin 
 Bychkov

V (B)

 Vavilov 
 Vaenga 
 Vagin 
 Valiev 
 Varennikov 
 Varfolomeyev 
 Vartanov 
 Varushkin 
 Vasilevsky 
 Vasilyev 
 Vasin 
 Vasnev 
 Vasnetsov 
 Vakhrushev 
 Vedeneyev 
 Vedenin 
 Vedernikov 
 Venediktov 
 Verenich 
 Vereshchagin 
 Vershinin 
 Veselov 
 Veselovsky 
 Vetochkin 
 Vetrov 
 Vinogradov 
 Vinokurov 
 Vitvinin 
 Vikhrov 
Vishnev 
 Vitsin 
 Vodovatov 
 Vodyanov 
 Volikov 
 Volkov 
 Volodin 
 Volosenkov 
 Voloshin 
 Volvakov 
 Vorobyov 
 Voronin 
 Voronkov 
 Voronov 
 Vorontsov 
 Voskoboynikov 
 Voskresensky 
 Votyakov 
 Vyrypayev 
 Vysotsky 
 Vyalitsyn

G (Г) 

 Gavrikov 
 Gavrilenkov 
 Gavrilov 
 Gagarin 
 Gagolin 
 Gazmanov 
 Galdin 
 Galyorkin 
 Galiaskarov 
 Galkin 
 Galygin 
 Garanin 
 Garin 
 Garifullin 
 Gachev 
 Genkin 
 Gerasimov 
 Gilyov 
 Glagolev 
 Glazkov 
 Glebov 
 Glinin 
 Globa 
 Glukhov 
 Govyadinov 
 Golov 
 Golovanov 
 Golovakha 
 Golovin 
 Golovkin 
 Golodyayev 
 Gololobov 
 Golubev 
 Golubkin 
 Golubov 
 Golubtsov 
 Golumbovsky 
 Goncharov 
 Gorbachev 
 Gorbunkov 
 Gorbunov 
 Gorev 
 Gorelov 
 Goremykin 
 Gornostayev 
 Gorokhov 
 Gorshkov 
 Goryunov 
 Gradsky 
 Grankin 
 Grafov 
 Grachyov 
 Grebenshchikov 
 Grekov 
 Greshnov 
 Gribanov 
 Gribkov 
 Gribov 
 Griboyedov 
 Grigoryev 
 Grinin 
 Grishin 
 Gromov 
 Gruzdev 
 Gruzinsky 
 Grushanin 
 Gryaznov 
 Gubanov 
 Gulin 
 Gunin 
 Gurkovsky 
 Guryev 
 Guryanov 
 Gusarov 
 Gusev 
 Gusin 
 Guslyakov 
 Guskov 
 Gushchin

D (Д) 

 Davydkin 
 Davydov 
 Dayneko 
 Datsishin 
 Datsyuk 
 Dvornikov 
 Degtyarev 
 Dedov 
 Dezhnyov 
 Delov 
 Demenok 
 Dementyev 
 Demidov 
 Denikin 
 Denisov 
 Derzhavin 
 Dernov 
 Dyogtev 
 Dyomin 
 Dmitriyev 
 Dobrolyubov 
 Dobronravov 
 Dobrynin 
 Dolgorukov 
 Dolzhikov 
 Domashyov 
 Domnin 
 Dorofeyev 
 Dorokhin 
 Dorokhov 
 Dostovalov 
 Dostoyevsky 
 Dragomirov 
 Dragunov 
 Dresvyanin 
 Dryomov 
 Druganin 
 Drugov 
 Dryagin 
 Dubinin 
 Dubinkin 
 Dubov 
 Dubolazov 
 Dubrovsky 
 Dudin 
 Dudko 
 Dudnik 
 Dultsev 
 Dunayevsky 
 Durov 
 Dykhovichny 
 Dyuzhenkov 
 Dyatlov 
 Delyanin 
 Dryga

Ye (Е) 

 Yevdokimov 
 Yevseyev 
 Yevstigneyev 
 Yevtushenkov 
 Yegorov 
 Yedemsky 
 Yezhov 
 Yelagin 
 Yeleshev 
 Yelizarov 
 Yeliseyev 
 Yeltsin 
 Yeltsov 
 Yelchin 
 Yemelin 
 Yemelyanov 
 Yengalychev 
 Yenin 
 Yeremeyev 
 Yeryomin 
 Yermakov 
 Yermilov 
 Yermolayev 
 Yermolov 
 Yermushin 
 Yerofeyev 
 Yerokhin 
 Yerkhov 
 Yershov 
 Yesaulov 
 Yesikov 
 Yesipov 
 Yefimov 
 Yefremov 
 Yeshevsky

Yo (Ё) 

 Yozhikov 
 Yozhin 
 Yolkin

Zh (Ж) 

 Zhabin 
 Zharkov 
 Zharykhin 
 Zhvikov 
 Zhdanov 
 Zheglov 
 Zhelezkin 
 Zheleznov 
 Zherdev 
 Zhernakov 
 Zhestokov 
 Zhyonov 
 Zhiglov 
 Zhigunov 
 Zhidkov 
 Zhikin 
 Zhilin 
 Zhilov 
 Zhirov 
 Zholdin 
 Zhuk 
 Zhukov 
 Zhuravlyov 
 Zhurov 
 Zhutov

Z (З) 

 Zabolotny 
 Zavrazhin 
 Zavrazhnov 
 Zavrazhny 
 Zavrazin 
 Zavyalov 
 Zagorodny 
 Zadornov 
 Zadorozhny 
 Zaytsev 
 Zakrevsky 
 Zaporozhets 
 Zarubin 
 Zaslavsky 
 Zakhaev 
 Zakharov 
 Zakharchenko 
 Zakharyin 
 Zverev 
 Zvyagin 
 Zefirov 
 Zyomin 
 Zimin 
 Zimkov 
 Zimnyakov 
 Zinchenko 
 Zlobin 
 Zolin 
 Zolotov 
 Zonov 
 Zorin 
 Zotov 
 Zubarev 
 Zubkov 
 Zubov 
 Zuyev 
 Zuykov 
 Zykin 
 Zykov 
 Zyryanov 
 Zyuganov

I (И) 

 Ibragimov 
 Ivakin 
 Ivankov 
 Ivanov 
 Ivashin 
 Ivashov 
 Ivkin 
 Ivleeva 
 Ivolgin 
 Ivchenko 
 Ignatkovich 
 Ignatyev 
 Igoshin 
 Igumnov 
 Izhutin 
 Izmaylov 
 Izyumov 
 Ilyin 
 Ilkun 
 Ilyushin 
 Ilyasov 
 Ilyukhin 
 Ilyushin 
 Ilyushkin 
 Inozemtsev 
 Ipatyev 
 Isayev 
 Ismaylov 
 Istomin 
 Ishutin 
 Ishcheglov (Ищеглов)
 Ishchegelov (Ищегелов)

K (К)

 Kablukov 
 Kaverin 
 Kadnikov 
 Kadurin 
 Kadtsyn 
 Kazak 
 Kazakov 
 Kazantsev 
 Kazankov 
 Kazarezov 
 Kalagin 
 Kalashnik 
 Kalashnikov 
 Kalganov 
 Kalinin 
 Kalugin 
 Kalyagin 
 Kamenev 
 Kamenkovich 
 Kamenskikh 
 Kamkin  
 Kandinsky 
 Kapitsa 
 Kapralov 
 Kapranov 
 Kapustin 
 Karavayev 
 Karandashov 
 Karaulin 
 Karaulov 
 Karbainov 
 Kargin 
 Karev 
 Karetnikov 
 Kariyev 
 Karnaukhov 
 Karryev 
 Kartashyov 
 Kartashov 
 Karchagin 
 Karyavin 
 Kasaty 
 Kasyanenko 
 Kasyanov 
 Katayev 
 Katerinochkin 
 Katin 
 Kachusov 
 Kasharin 
 Kashirin 
 Kashirsky 
 Kashnikov 
 Kashuba 
 Kvasov 
 Kedrov 
 Kilesso 
 Kipriyanov 
 Kireyev 
 Kirillov 
 Kirilov 
 Kirkorov 
 Kirsanov 
 Kiryanov 
 Kiselev 
 Kislukhin 
 Klebleyev 
 Klepak 
 Klepin 
 Klimov 
 Klimushin 
 Klimtsov 
 Klokov 
 Knyazev 
 Kobzon 
 Kobyakov 
 Kovalevsky 
 Kovalenko 
 Kovalyov 
 Kovrov 
 Kovshutin 
 Kozhurov 
 Kozhukhov 
 Kozakov 
 Kozar 
 Kozlov 
 Kozlovsky 
 Kozyrev 
 Kolesnikov 
 Kolesov 
 Kollerov 
 Kolobkov 
 Kolomnikov 
 Kolontayev 
 Kolosov 
 Kolupayev 
 Koltsov 
 Komarov 
 Komzin 
 Komissarov 
 Komolov 
 Kondratyev 
 Kondurov 
 Kondyurin 
 Konev 
 Konin 
 Konnikov 
 Konovalov 
 Konstantinov 
 Konyakov 
 Konyashov 
 Kopeykin 
 Kopsov 
 Koptsev 
 Korablyov 
 Korablin 
 Korenev 
 Korzhakov 
 Korzhev 
 Kornev 
 Korneyev 
 Kornilov 
 Korovin 
 Korolyov 
 Korotayev 
 Koroteyev 
 Korotkin 
 Korotkov 
 Kortnev 
 Korchagin 
 Koryavin 
 Koryavov 
 Kosarev 
 Kosarin 
 Koskov 
 Kosomov 
 Kosorukov 
 Kostin 
 Kostomarov 
 Kostyushkin 
 Kosyak 
 Kotov 
 Kochenkov 
 Koshelev 
 Koshechkin 
 Koshkin 
 Kravchuk 
 Krayev 
 Krayevsky 
 Kramnik 
 Krasnov 
 Krasnopyorov 
 Krasotkin 
 Krasavin 
 Krid 
 Krivkov 
 Krivov 
 Krivoukhov 
 Kryuchkov 
 Kropanin 
 Krug 
 Kruglov 
 Krukov   
 Krupin 
 Krupich 
 Krupnov 
 Krutikov 
 Krutin 
 Krutov 
 Krutoy 
 Kruchinkin 
 Krylov 
 Krymov 
 Krysov 
 Kryukov 
 Kublanov 
 Kubyshkin 
 Kuvayev 
 Kudashov 
 Kudrin 
 Kudryavtsev 
 Kudryashov 
 Kuznetsov 
 Kuzubov 
 Kuzkin 
 Kuzmin 
 Kuzmich 
 Kuimov 
 Kuklachyov 
 Kuklev 
 Kuklin 
 Kulagin 
 Kulakov 
 Kulibin 
 Kulik 
 Kulikov 
 Kuptsov 
 Kurakin 
 Kurbatov 
 Kurganov 
 Kurdin 
 Kurepin 
 Kuritsyn 
 Kurochkin 
 Kurpatov 
 Kurtashkin 
 Kurchin 
 Kustov 
 Kutepov 
 Kutikov 
 Kutuzov 
 Kutyakov

L (Л) 

 Lavrentyev 
 Lavrov 
 Lagoshin 
 Lagransky 
Lastovka 
 Lagutov 
 Lazarev 
 Lantsov 
 Lapayev 
 Lapidus 
 Lapin 
 Lapotnikov 
 Laptev 
 Lapunov 
 Larin 
 Larionov 
 Lachinov 
 Lachkov 
 Lebedev 
 Lebedinsky 
 Lebedintsev 
 Lebed 
 Levin 
 Levkin 
 Ledovskoy 
 Lelukh 
 Lenin 
 Leonidov 
 Leonov 
 Leontiev 
 Lepyokhin 
 Leps 
 Lermontov 
 Leskov 
 Lesnichy 
 Letov 
 Leshev 
 Leshchenko 
 Leshchyov 
 Lyovkin 
 Lidin 
 Lilov 
 Limonov 
 Lipin 
 Lipov 
 Lisitsyn 
 Lisov 
 Listratov 
 Listunov 
 Likhachyov 
 Loban 
 Lobanov 
 Lobachevsky 
 Lobachyov 
 Lobov 
 Lovzansky 
 Loginov 
 Loginovsky 
 Loktev 
 Loktionov 
 Lomovtsev 
 Lomonosov 
 Lomtev 
 Lopatin 
Lopatkin 
 Lopukhov 
 Losev 
 Losevsky 
 Loskutnikov 
 Loskutov 
 Loshchilov 
 Lubashev 
 Luzhkov 
 Lukashenko 
 Lukin 
 Lukov 
 Lukyanenko 
 Lukyanov 
 Lyzlov 
 Lytkin 
 Lvov 
 Lyubimov 
 Lyubimtsev 
 Lyutenkov 
 Lyutov 
 Lyagushkin 
 Lyagushov 
 Lyadov 
 Lyalyushkin 
 Lyamin 
 Lyapin 
 Lyapunov

M (М) 

 Mager 
 Magomedov 
 Maysak 
 Makarov 
 Maklakov 
 Maksimov 
 Maksimushkin 
 Maksudov 
 Malakhov 
 Malikov 
 Malinin 
 Malinov 
 Malkin 
 Malyshev 
 Malykhin 
 Malyugin 
 Mamin 
 Mamonov 
 Mamykin 
 Manin 
 Mantorov 
 Manyakin 
 Marin 
 Marinin 
 Marinkin 
 Markin 
 Markov 
 Martyushev 
 Maryin 
 Maslak 
 Maslov 
 Matveyev 
 Makhmudov 
 Masharin 
 Mashir 
 Medvedev 
 Medvedkov 
 Mednikov 
 Meledin 
 Melekhov 
 Meleshchuk 
 Melikov 
 Melnikov 
 Menshikov 
 Menshchikov 
 Merkulov 
 Merkushev 
 Mesyats 
 Mekhantyev 
 Meshcheryakov 
 Migunov 
 Milyokhin 
 Miloradov 
 Milov 
 Milyukov 
 Milyutin 
 Minayev 
 Mineyev 
 Minin 
 Minkin 
 Minkovsky 
 Mirnov 
 Mirny 
 Mirov 
 Mironov 
 Mirokhin 
 Mirsky 
 Misalov 
 Mitin 
 Mitkin 
 Mitrofanov 
 Mikhaylov 
 Mikhalyov 
 Mikhalitsin 
 Mikhalitsyn 
 Mikheyev 
 Miloslavsky 
 Mishin 
 Mishnyov 
 Mishutin 
 Mozhayev 
 Moiseyev 
 Mokrivsky 
 Molchanov 
 Mordvinov 
 Morenov 
 Morozov 
 Moroshkin 
 Moryakov 
 Mosalyov 
 Mosin 
 Moskalyov 
 Moskvin 
 Mosyakov 
 Mokhov 
 Muravyov 
 Muratov 
 Murogov 
 Mukhametshin 
 Mukhanov 
 Mukhin 
 Mukhortov 
 Myshelov 
 Myshkin 
 Myagkov 
 Myasnikov 
 Myatlev 
 Myaukin

N (Н) 

 Nabatov 
 Nazarov 
 Nasonov 
 Naumenko 
 Naumov 
 Nachalov 
 Nevzorov 
 Nezhdanov 
 Nekrasov 
 Nekrestyanov 
 Nemtsev 
 Nemtsov 
 Nenashev 
 Nepein 
 Nesterov 
 Netrebko 
 Nechayev 
 Nizamutdinov 
 Nikitin 
 Nikiforov 
 Nikishin 
 Nikolayev 
 Nikonov 
 Nikulin 
 Novichkov 
Novikov 
 Novokshonov 
 Novoseltsev 
 Nozdryov 
 Nozdrin 
 Norin 
 Nosachyov 
 Noskov 
 Nosov 
 Nuriyev 
 Nuriyev 
 Nurmagomedov

O (О) 

 Obnizov 
 Obolensky 
 Oborin 
Obraztsov 
 Ovechkin 
 Ogarkov 
 Ogievich 
 Ogorodnikov 
 Ogurtsov 
 Ozerov 
 Okulov 
 Olenev 
 Olkhovsky 
 Omelnitskiy 
 Onegin 
 Onipchenko 
 Opokin 
 Orbakaite 
 Orlov 
 Osin 
 Osinov 
 Osintsev 
 Osipov 
 Osipenkov 
 Osminin 
 Osokin 
 Osolodkin 
 Ostaltsev 
 Ostapyuk 
 Ostroverkhov 
 Ostrovsky 
 Oshurkov 
 Oshchov

P (П) 

 Pavlenko 
 Pavlov 
 Palyulin 
 Panarin 
 Panin 
 Pankin 
 Pankov 
 Pankratov 
 Panfilov 
 Pankiv 
 Papanov 
 Paramonov 
 Parshikov 
 Parshin 
 Pasternak 
 Pastukh 
 Paskhin 
 Patrushev 
 Paulkin 
 Pakhomov 
 Pashin 
 Pashkov 
 Pevtsov 
 Pelevin 
 Pelyovin 
 Penkin 
 Pervak 
 Perevalov 
 Pereverzev 
 Perevyortov 
 Perezhogin 
 Perestoronin 
 Perminov 
 Permyakov 
 Perov 
 Perfilyev 
 Pestov 
 Petrenko 
 Petrov 
 Petrukhin 
 Petukhov 
 Pechkin 
 Pivovarov 
 Pimenov 
 Pirogov 
 Pirozhkov 
 Pichugin 
 Pichushkin 
 Pishchalnikov 
 Plaksin 
 Platonov 
 Plemyannikov 
 Plisetsky 
 Pogodin 
 Pogrebnov 
 Poda 
 Podshivalov 
 Pozharsky 
 Pozdnyakov 
 Pokrovsky 
 Polivanov 
 Polishchuk 
 Polnaryov 
 Polovtsev 
 Polotentsev 
 Poltanov 
 Poltorak 
 Polunin 
 Polushin 
 Polyakov 
 Pomelov 
 Pomelnikov 
 Ponikarov 
 Ponomaryov 
 Ponchikov 
 Popov 
 Popyrin 
 Portnov 
 Posokhov 
 Potapov 
 Potyomkin 
 Prazdnikov 
 Preobrazhensky 
 Presnyakov 
 Pribylov 
 Privalov 
 Prigozhin 
 Primakov 
 Prikhodko 
 Pronin 
 Pronichev 
 Proskurkin 
 Protasov 
 Prokhorov 
 Pugachyov 
 Pugin 
 Pudin 
 Pudovkin 
 Puzakov 
 Puzanov 
 Putilin 
 Putilov 
 Putin 
 Putyatin 
 Pushkaryov 
 Pushkin 
 Pushnoy 
 Pshenichnikov 
 Pyryev 
 Piekha 
 Pyanykh 
 Pyatosin

R (Р) 

 Rabinovich 
 Razin 
 Razuvayev 
 Ramazanov  
 Raskalov 
 Raspopov 
 Rasputin 
 Rasskazov 
 Rastorguyev 
 Ratkevich 
 Rafikov 
 Ravenov 
 Revyagin 
 Revyakin 
 Reznichenko 
 Reznikov 
 Reznov 
 Remizov 
 Repin 
 Retyunskikh 
 Reshetilov 
 Reshetnikov 
 Rzhevsky 
 Roborovsky 
 Rogachyov 
 Rogov 
 Rogozin 
 Rodzyanko 
 Rodin 
 Rodchenko 
 Rozhkov 
 Rozanov 
 Rozovsky 
 Rokossovsky 
 Romanov 
 Rostov 
 Rostovtsev 
 Roshchin 
 Rubashkin 
 Rudavin 
 Rudin 
 Rudnikov 
 Rudov 
 Rumyantsev 
 Runov 
 Rurik 
 Rusakov 
 Rusanov 
 Rusnak 
 Russkikh 
 Ruchkin 
 Rybakov 
 Rybalkin 
 Ryzhanov 
 Ryzhikov 
 Ryzhkov 
 Ryzhov 
 Rykov 
 Ryndin 
 Rychenkov 
 Ryurikov 
 Ryabkin 
 Ryabkov 
 Ryabov 
 Ryabtsev 
 Ryakhin

S (С) 

 Sabantsev 
 Sabitov 
 Savasin 
 Savichev 
 Savkin 
 Savvatimov 
 Savvin 
 Savenkov 
 Savinkov 
 Savrasov 
 Sagadeyev 
 Sadovsky 
 Sadykov 
 Sazonov 
 Saitov 
 Say 
 Salagin 
 Salimov 
 Salko 
 Saltanov 
 Salkov 
 Salnikov 
 Samarin 
 Samoylov 
 Samokhin 
 Samsonov 
 Sannikov 
 Sapalyov 
 Sapogov 
 Sapozhnikov 
 Saprykin 
 Sarnychev 
 Safiullin 
 Safronov 
 Sakharov 
 Sayankin 
 Sayanov 
 Svalov 
 Severinov 
 Severyukhin 
 Severny 
 Severov 
 Sevostyanov 
 Sedelnikov 
 Sedov 
 Sedokova 
 Seleznyov 
 Selivanov 
 Semerikov 
 Semyonov 
 Semyanin 
 Senotrusov 
 Senkin 
 Sergeyev 
 Serebrov 
 Serebryakov 
 Seryabkina 
 Seryogin 
 Serov 
 Serpionov 
 Sechenov 
 Syomin 
 Sivakov 
 Sigayev 
 Sigalov 
 Sigachyov 
 Sidorov 
 Sizov 
 Sizy 
 Silayev 
 Silivanov 
 Silin 
 Silvestrov 
 Silnov 
 Simakin 
 Simonov 
 Sitnikov 
 Siyanin 
 Siyanko 
 Siyanov 
 Siyanovich 
 Skvortsov 
 Skorobogatov 
 Skorokhodov 
 Skryabin 
 Skumin 
 Skuratov 
 Slavsky 
 Slepynin 
 Slobozhanin 
 Sluchevsky 
 Smagin 
 Smetanin 
 Smekhov 
 Smeshnoy 
 Smirnitsky 
 Smirnov 
 Smolin 
 Smolyaninov 
 Smotrov 
 Snatkin 
 Snegiryov 
 Snetkov 
 Sobachkin 
 Sobolev 
 Sobolevsky 
 Sobchak 
 Sokolov 
 Soldatov 
 Solovyov 
 Solodnikov 
 Solodskikh 
 Solomakhin 
 Solomin 
 Solomonov 
 Somov 
 Sonin 
 Sopov 
 Sorokin 
 Spanov 
 Speransky 
 Spravtsev 
 Stalin 
 Starikov 
 Staroverov 
 Starodubov 
 Starodubtsev 
 Startsev 
 Statnik 
 Steblyov 
 Stezhensky 
 Stepanov 
 Stepankov 
 Stepashin 
 Stepnov 
 Strekalov 
 Strelkov 
 Strelnikov 
 Streltsov 
 Stroganov 
 Subbotin 
 Subotin 
 Suvorin 
 Suvorkin 
 Suvorov 
 Sudlenkov 
 Sungatulin 
 Sukachyov 
 Sukin 
 Sukletin 
 Sultanov 
 Suprunov 
 Surikov 
 Surkov 
 Surnin 
 Suslyakov 
 Susnin 
 Sutulin 
 Sukhanov 
 Sukharnikov 
 Sukhikh 
 Sukhorukov 
 Suchkin 
 Suchkov 
 Schastlivtsev 
 Sysoyev 
 Sytnikov 
 Sychyov 
 Sychkin 
 Syanov

T (Т)

 Tabakov 
 Talalikhin 
 Talanov 
 Tamarkin 
 Tamakhin 
 Tankov 
 Tarasov 
 Tarkovsky 
 Tarnovetsky 
 Tatarinov 
 Tatarintsev 
 Tatarov 
 Tataurov 
 Tattar 
 Taushev 
 Tvardovsky 
 Telitsyn 
  Temnikov 
 Teplov 
 Teplyashin 
 Terebov 
 Terekhov 
 Tereshkov 
 Tereshchenko 
 Teryoshin 
 Teterev 
 Tyomkin 
 Timofeyev 
 Timoshenko 
 Timoshkin 
 Titov 
 Titovich 
 Tikhvinsky 
 Tikhomirov 
 Tikhonenko 
 Tikhonov 
 Tikhokhod 
 Tkachenko 
 Tkachyov 
 Tokarev 
 Tokmakov 
 Tolbanov 
 Tolkachyov 
 Tolmachyov 
 Tolokonsky 
 Tolstobrov 
 Tolstoy 
 Tolstokozhev 
 Toporkov 
 Toporov 
 Toropov 
 Torshin 
 Travkin 
 Travnikov 
 Trapeznikov 
 Trediakovsky 
 Tretyakov 
 Trifonov 
 Trofimov 
 Trotsky 
 Trusov 
 Trutnev 
 Trufanov 
 Trukhin 
 Tryndin 
 Tumasov 
 Tupitsyn 
 Tupolev 
 Turbin 
 Turgenev 
 Turov 
 Tukhachevsky 
 Tychkin 
 Tyushnyakov

U (У) 

 Uvarov 
 Uglitsky 
 Uglichinin 
 Uglov 
 Ugolev 
 Ugolnikov 
 Udom 
 Ulanov 
 Ulitsky 
 Ulyanin 
 Ulyanov 
 Ulyashin 
 Umanov 
 Umsky 
 Ungern 
 Unkovsky 
 Untilov 
 Urakov 
 Uralets 
 Urbanovsky 
 Uritsky 
 Urusov 
 Usatov 
 Usachyov 
 Usenko 
 Usilov 
 Usov 
 Uspensky 
 Ustimovich 
 Ustinov 
 Ustyuzhanin 
 Utyosov 
 Ukhov 
 Ukhtomsky 
 Ushakov

F (Ф) 

 Fadeyev 
 Fanin 
 Fanygin 
 Fedin 
 Fedoseyev 
 Fedosov 
 Fedotov 
 Fedulov 
 Fedchenkov 
 Fenenko 
 Fetisov 
 Fyodorov 
 Filatov 
 Filenkov 
 Filimonov 
 Filipov 
 Filippov 
 Filchenkov 
 Firsov 
 Flyorov 
 Fokin 
 Fomenkov 
 Fomin 
 Fomichyov 
 Fonvizin 
 Foroponov 
 Franko 
 Frantsev 
 Frolov 
 Fukin 
 Furmanov 
 Fynyov

Kh (Х) 

 Khabalov 
 Khabarov 
 Khabensky 
 Khalipov 
 Khalturin 
 Khamidullin 
 Khanipov 
 Khantsev 
 Kharitonov 
 Kharlamov 
 Kharmats 
 Khvostovsky 
 Khigir 
 Khlebnikov 
 Khlebov 
 Khloponin 
 Khmelnov 
 Khovansky 
 Kholodnaya  
 Kholodov 
 Khomkolov 
 Khorkov 
 Khomorkov  
 Khokhlachyov 
 Khramov 
 Khrebtov 
 Khromov 
 Khrushchev 
 Khudovekov 
 Khudyakov 
 Khurtin

Ts (Ц) 

 Tsaplin 
 Tsaregorodtsev 
 Tsaryov 
 Tsaritsyn 
 Tsvetayev 
 Tsvetkov 
 Tsvetnov 
 Tsvilenev 
 Tseytlin 
 Tselikovsky 
 Tsertelev 
 Tsekhanovetsky 
 Tsigler 
 Tsimmerman 
 Tsiolkovsky 
 Tsirinsky 
 Tsirkunov 
 Tsiryulnikov 
 Tsitsianov 
 Tsukanov 
 Tsulukidze 
 Tsyganov 
 Tsyzyrev 
 Tsyukov

Ch (Ч) 

 Chaadayev 
 Chadov 
 Chazov 
 Chayka 
 Chaykovsky 
 Chaly 
 Chapayev 
 Charkov 
 Chebotaryov 
 Chebykin 
 Chekmaryov 
 Chekudayev 
 Chelomey 
 Chelpanov 
 Chemeris 
 Chendev 
 Chepurin 
 Chervyakov 
 Cherenchikov 
 Cherepanov 
 Cherkasov 
 Cherkashin 
 Chernakov 
 Chernukhin 
 Chernetsky 
 Chernikov 
 Chernobrovin 
 Chernov 
 Chernomyrdin 
 Chernykh 
 Chernyshyov 
 Chernyavsky 
 Chesnokov 
 Chekhov 
 Chigrakov 
 Chizhikov 
 Chilayev 
 Chistyakov 
 Chichikov 
 Chichkanov 
 Chkalov 
 Chmykhov 
 Chubarov 
 Chugunov 
 Chudov 
 Chuzhinov 
 Chukreyev 
 Chumakov 
 Chupalov 
 Chupakhin 
 Chupov 
 Chuprakov 
 Chuprin 
 Chuprov 
 Churkin 
 Chuchanov

Sh (Ш) 

 Shabalin 
 Shabunin 
 Shaburov 
 Shakmakov 
 Shalyapin 
 Shapovalov 
 Shaposhnikov 
 Sharapov 
 Sharov 
 Sharonov 
 Sharshin 
 Shastin 
 Shatalov 
 Shatunov 
 Shashlov 
 Shvedov 
 Shvernik 
 Shevelyov 
 Shelagin 
 Shelepov 
 Shelomov 
 Shelyapin 
 Shepovalov 
 Sheremetyev 
 Sherstov 
 Shibalov 
 Shigayev 
 Shigin 
 Shikalov 
 Shinsky 
 Shirinov 
 Shirmanov 
 Shirkov 
 Shirokov 
 Shikhov 
 Shikhranov 
 Shishkanov 
 Shishkin 
 Shishko 
 Shishlov 
 Shishov 
 Shkuratov 
 Shkut 
 Shlykov 
 Shmagin 
 Shmakov 
 Shmelyov 
 Shpak 
 Shpikalov 
 Shubin 
 Shubkin 
 Shuvalov 
 Shuysky 
 Shukov 
 Shukshin 
 Shulyov 
 Shulga 
 Shulgin 
 Shuldeshov 
 Shults 
 Shurupov 
 Shurshalin 
 Shurygin 
 Shukhov

Shch (Щ) 

 Shchavelsky 
 Shchavlev 
 Shchegelsky 
 Shcheglov 
 Shchegolev 
 Shchegolikhin 
 Shchegolyayev 
 Shchedrin 
 Shchedrov 
 Shchekochikhin 
 Shchepkin 
 Shcherbakov 
 Shcherbatykh 
 Shcherbina 
 Shchetinin 
 Shchetkin 
 Shchyotkin 
 Shchukin 
 Shchurov

E (Э) 

 Eybozhenko 
 Ekel 
 Elembayev 
 Elkin 
 Elmpt 
 Emin 
 Emsky 
 Engelgardt 
 Engovatov 
 Entin 
 Epinger 
 Erdeli 
 Eristov 
 Essen 
 Etush

Yu (Ю) 

 Yubkin 
 Yugov 
 Yudachyov 
 Yudashkin 
 Yudin 
 Yuditsky 
 Yumatov 
 Yumashev 
 Yunge 
 Yunevich 
 Yunkin 
 Yurasov 
 Yurenev 
 Yurin 
 Yurkov 
 Yurlov 
 Yurnayev 
 Yuryev 
 Yusupov 
 Yuferev 
 Yukhantsev 
 Yushakov 
 Yushkov 
 Yushkivyin

See also 
 Eastern Slavic naming customs
 Romanization of Russian
 List of surnames in Ukraine

References 
 
  Словарь русских фамилий
  Ономастикон Веселовского
 Yumaguzin V.V., Vinnik M.V. (2019) Surnames in modern Russia. Annals of Human Biology, 46:6, 475-490

Russia
 
Surnames